Montezuma is a city in Gray County, Kansas, United States.  As of the 2020 census, the population of the city was 975.

History
Montezuma was founded in 1879, and relocated in 1912 to the Santa Fe Railroad. It was named for Moctezuma II, ruler of the Aztec empire.

Geography
Montezuma is located at  (37.595353, -100.442205).

Climate
According to the Köppen Climate Classification system, Montezuma has a semi-arid climate, abbreviated "BSk" on climate maps.

Demographics

2010 census
As of the census of 2010, there were 966 people, 366 households, and 249 families residing in the city. The racial makeup of the city was 95.7% White, 0.1% African American, 0.9% Native American, 2.5% from other races, and 0.8% from two or more races. Hispanic or Latino of any race were 11.0% of the population.

There were 366 households, of which 30.1% had children under the age of 18 living with them, 59.6% were married couples living together, 5.7% had a female householder with no husband present, 2.7% had a male householder with no wife present, and 32.0% were non-families. 28.7% of all households were made up of individuals, and 16.1% had someone living alone who was 65 years of age or older. The average household size was 2.50 and the average family size was 3.14.

The median age in the city was 36.8 years. 24.9% of residents were under the age of 18; 8.1% were between the ages of 18 and 24; 24.4% were from 25 to 44; 19.1% were from 45 to 64; and 23.5% were 65 years of age or older. The gender makeup of the city was 45.5% male and 54.5% female.

2000 census
As of the census of 2000, there were 966 people, 335 households, and 235 families residing in the city. The racial makeup of the city was 93.58% White, 0.21% Native American, 0.21% Pacific Islander, 3.73% from other races, and 2.28% from two or more races. Hispanic or Latino of any race were 9.21% of the population.

There were 335 households, out of which 32.2% had children under the age of 18 living with them, 62.1% were married couples living together, 6.0% had a female householder with no husband present, and 29.6% were non-families. 27.2% of all households were made up of individuals, and 13.7% had someone living alone who was 65 years of age or older. The average household size was 2.55 and the average family size was 3.13.

In the city, the population was spread out, with 25.6% under the age of 18, 8.4% from 18 to 24, 21.6% from 25 to 44, 15.6% from 45 to 64, and 28.8% who were 65 years of age or older. The median age was 39 years. For every 100 females, there were 79.9 males. For every 100 females age 18 and over, there were 73.7 males.

The median income for a household in the city was $36,719, and the median income for a family was $41,528. Males had a median income of $31,500 versus $23,750 for females. The per capita income for the city was $19,052. About 5.6% of families and 11.0% of the population were below the poverty line, including 17.8% of those under age 18 and 6.2% of those age 65 or over.

Economy
The Gray County Wind Farm near Montezuma is the largest wind farm in Kansas.

Education
Montezuma is a part of USD 371 South Gray Schools. USD 371 and USD 476 share South Gray High School. The South Gray High School mascot is the Rebels.

Prior to school unification, the Montezuma High School mascot was the Indians. The Montezuma Indians won the Kansas State High School boys class BB basketball championship in 1955.

References

Further reading

External links
 Montezuma - Directory of Public Officials
 USD 371, local school district
 Montezuma City Map, KDOT

Cities in Kansas
Cities in Gray County, Kansas